Araki Station may refer to:

 Araki Station (Fukuoka)
 Araki Station (Chiba)